Mykola Kostiantynovych Zerov (Ukrainian: Микола Костянтинович Зеров; 26 April 1890, in Zinkiv, Poltava Governorate – 3 November 1937, in Sandarmokh, Karelia) was a Ukrainian poet, translator, classical and literary scholar and critic. He is considered to be one of the leading figures of the Executed Renaissance.

Brief biography
He studied philology at Saint Vladimir University in Kyiv. From 1917 to 1920, he edited the bibliographical journal. He was a professor of Ukrainian literature at the Kyiv Architectural Institute (1918–1920), the Kyiv Co-operative Tekhnikum (1923–1925), and the Kyiv Institute of People's Education (1923–1935). He also taught the theory of translation at the Ukrainian Institute of Linguistic Education (1930–1933).

Mykola Zerov was perhaps the most talented of the Neoclassicist movement of poets in 1920s Ukraine. Despite Communist demands that all creative works conform to Socialist Realism, the neoclassical movement stressed the production of 'high art' for an educated and highly literate audience. Zerov, particularly, eschewed contemporary politics in his poetry, focusing on aesthetic and historical classical themes under a tight and difficult poetical structure. This approach eventually proved fatal, as Zerov, along with many other Ukrainian writers of the period, was accused for anti-Soviet activities and later sent to Solovki prison camp (he was arrested by the NKVD in April 1935 and sentenced to 10 years' imprisonment). A special NKVD troika of the Leningrad Region sentenced him to death on 9 October 1937. Zerov was shot on 3 November 1937 in Sandarmokh, Karelia.

Zerov was formally rehabilitated in 1958 and selections of his poetry were published in 1966, but a full rehabilitation was blocked by hostility from official critics.

Memory 
Streets were named after Zerov in Dnipro, Lviv, Vinnytsia, Rivne, Novomyrhorod. In 2020 Kyiv's Nikolai Ostrovsky Park was renamed Mykola Zerov Park (to comply with the 2015 Ukrainian decommunization laws).

At the Australian National University, Monash University, there is a chair of Ukrainian language and Ukrainian research centre named after Zerov.

References

External links
 Encyclopedia of Ukraine on Mykola Zerov
 Сергій Шевченко. Микола Зеров: неокласика політичних репресій // Кримська світлиця. — 2014. — No. 39. — 26 вересня. 

1890 births
1937 deaths
People from Poltava Oblast
People from Zenkovsky Uyezd
Ukrainian writers
Great Purge victims from Ukraine
Soviet rehabilitations